"How Old Are You" is a single released by Robin Gibb, the third and final single released from the album of the same name in October 1983. It reached #93 in the UK and #37 in Germany. "How Old Are You" likewise has the rhythm guitar beat, bang-away drumming, a powerful horn and synthesizer blend.

Chart performance

References

1983 singles
Robin Gibb songs
Songs written by Robin Gibb
Songs written by Maurice Gibb
Song recordings produced by Robin Gibb
Song recordings produced by Maurice Gibb
Polydor Records singles
1983 songs